is a chain of restaurants in Hawaii and Japan. The first branch opened in 1973 in Hawaii; most of its expansion since has been in Japan. 

The chain is also famous in Japan for their waitress uniforms. These consist of a white blouse; an orange or pink miniskirted jumper-style dress, with the "waistline" cut beneath the breasts, in the manner of a bodice; a matching apron; and a heart-shaped name tag.

In June 2022, parent corporation Imuraya announced that the last active Anna Miller's restaurant in Japan, located in Takanawa, would close on August 31, 2022. The restaurant, which opened in 1983, was the 11th of 25 restaurants in the chain. As a result of the closure, the restaurant in Hawaii now serves as the last Anna Miller’s location in the world.

Cultural references
Yuka Takeuchi, the main character from the video game series Variable Geo (and its anime spin-off) wears waitress uniform from Anna Miller's during battle, where the restaurant is called "Hanna Miller's".
In the anime series Excel Saga, the characters Excel and Hyatt work in a cafe wearing Anna Miller's waitress uniforms.
In the anime series Oh My Goddess!, the character Urd works in the restaurant "Ana Miller's" later in the series, wearing the same uniform.
In El Cazador de la Bruja, the fictional restaurant Amigo Tacos has Anna Miller's–styled uniforms, which consist of a green apron and an orange-trimmed dark blue dress. The nametag is in the shape of lips.
In the Japanese visual novel Welcome to Pia Carrot, the action revolves around restaurants in the fictional "Pia Carrot" chain. The waitresses in this restaurants wear uniforms similar to the ones of Anna Miller's. There are also several anime series based on the game.
In the popular web comic MegaTokyo one of the main female characters, Nanasawa Kimiko, works as a waitress at an Anna Millers in the city Tokyo, Japan.
In Miyuki-chan in Wonderland, the Doorway Girl wears a similar uniform.
In ROUJIN-Z, the lead female character works at an Anna Miller's, wearing the trademark uniform.
Akira Uehara, main character from Your and My Secret (Boku to Kanojo no XXX) works at Anna Miller's restaurant, after changing bodies with his classmate Nanako Momoi, using the famous brand uniform, with an apron.
In Metal Slug Attack, a female Rebel cyborg named Vita wears an Anna Miller's like waitress uniform.
In Girl Friends (manga), Tamami works at an Anna Miller's

See also

 List of restaurants in Hawaii

References

External links
 Anna Miller's Restaurant—Official site
 Anna Miller's—The official Japanese home page. 

1973 establishments in Hawaii
Cosplay
Food and drink companies of Japan
Regional restaurant chains in the United States
Restaurants established in 1973
Restaurants in Hawaii